Armand Biniakounou (born 10 July 1961) is a Congolese sprinter. He competed in the 4 × 100 metres relay at the 1988 Summer Olympics and the 1992 Summer Olympics.

References

1961 births
Living people
Athletes (track and field) at the 1988 Summer Olympics
Athletes (track and field) at the 1992 Summer Olympics
Republic of the Congo male sprinters
Olympic athletes of the Republic of the Congo
Place of birth missing (living people)